Denise Castle, 49, is a British boxer who currently holds the atomweight world championship. Castle is also a former Muay Thai world champion.

Muay Thai 
Castle was a Muay Thai professional between 2005 and 2014. During that time, she fought 21 times, winning on 11 occasions. Castles also lost nine of her Muay Thai fights, and drew once. Out of her 11 wins, three were down to a technical knock-out (TKO).

Castle won her first four fights, and clinched the World Kickboxing Association (WKA) British title on her fourth fight. Castle defeated Emma Armour on points to become a British Champion.

In 2006, Castle failed to win in any of her four bouts, with three loses and one draw to Tracey Richards. In her first fight of 2006, Castle faced LA Champion, Patti Teran, eight weeks after giving birth to her first child. After five rounds, Teran won on points. Her remaining two losses that year were also lost on points.

Castle's only fight in 2007 was a rematch against Teran, for the WIKBA Intercontinental title. Castle got her revenge, winning on points to claim the title.

Castle fought twice in 2008, and lost both times. In the Queens Birthday Cup, held in Thailand, Castle fought Funna Groundrat  and lost on points. Castle's first lost by TKO came in the same year against Amy Davies, who won the fight in the second round.

After not fighting throughout 2009, Castle, returned to the ring in 2010 and won three out of her four fights. Her only loss that year came against Lotta Loikkanen, for the World Boxing Council (WBC) World Muay Thai Mini Flyweight Title. Five months later, Castle fought Terra Waffa for the FIBA World Title, and won in the second round by TKO.

The following year, Castle continued her success and won the WBC International Minimumweight Title. She defeated Annie Eriksson for the second time in a little over a year to claim the title. However, for the second time in consecutive years, Castle lost the World Muay Thai Mini Flyweight Title, this time to Erika Kamimura. It was Castles first and only defeat by knockout (KO) in her Muay Thai career.

In 2012, Castle claimed the WBC World Minimumweight Title by defeating Nattaya Kantasit on points. Later that year, despite narrowly losing the S1 World Title to Lona Lookboonmee in the King's Cup Bangkok 2012, Castle became the first female to win Fighter of the Night. The fight was also voted as Fight of the Night. Given how close the match was between the two fighters, a rematch was arranged for the following year.

Castles first fight in 2013 ended in defeat to Silvia La Knotte. In the rematch between Castle and Lookboonmee, Castle got her revenge and defeated Lookboonmee to clinch the S1 World Title. This was Castles final Muay Thai fight.

Boxing 
Her success in Muay Thai was recognised by the WBC, and as a result, Castle was awarded the 2013 'Inspirational Female Athlete of the Year'. After winning this accolade, Castle became a mandatory contender for the WBC World Boxing title, encouraging the decision to switch disciplines in 2014.

In Castle's first match as a professional boxer, she defeated Dogmaifai Keatpompetch with a first-round KO, just two days before defeating Dorkmaipah Kiatpompetch by TKO in the sixth round. Despite the great start to her boxing career, she ended 2014 with a loss to Momo Koseki, meaning she lost the WBC Atomweight Title. Koseki won by TKO in round eight.

This proved to be Castle's last fight for four years. After Koseki moved up to a new weight division in 2018, the Atomweight Title became vacant. Castle's made her comeback this year, and fought Fabiana Bytiqi. The fight ended in defeat for Castle, after a unanimous decision (UD) was made in favour of the Czech boxer.

In the following year, Castle became the WIBA World Minimumweight Champion after defeating Sutthinee Bamrungpao. Castle won by TKO in round five to clinch the title.

Personal life 
Castle is married to Lorne Castle, and has three daughters. Castle's maiden name is Mellor.

Professional boxing record

References 

Women boxers
Living people
Atomweight boxers
Muay Thai
Year of birth missing (living people)